Sturgeon Lake 101 is an Indian reserve of the Sturgeon Lake First Nation in Saskatchewan. It is 29 kilometres northwest of Prince Albert. In the 2016 Canadian Census, it recorded a population of 1174 living in 287 of its 293 total private dwellings. In the same year, its Community Well-Being index was calculated at 43 of 100, compared to 58.4 for the average First Nations community and 77.5 for the average non-Indigenous community.

References

Indian reserves in Saskatchewan
Division No. 16, Saskatchewan